
Gmina Medyka is a rural gmina (administrative district) in Przemyśl County, Subcarpathian Voivodeship, in south-eastern Poland, on the border with Ukraine.

Villages
Gmina Medyka contains the villages and settlements of Hureczko, Hurko, Jaksmanice, Leszno, Medyka, Siedliska and Torki.

Neighbouring gminas
Gmina Medyka is bordered by the city of Przemyśl and by the gminas of Przemyśl, Stubno and Żurawica. It also borders Ukraine.

References

Polish official population figures 2006

Medyka
Przemyśl County